Andrew Kohut (September 2, 1942 – September 8, 2015) was an American pollster and nonpartisan news commentator about public affairs topics.

Life and career
He was born in Newark, New Jersey and was raised in Rochelle Park, New Jersey. His parents were Peter, a glassblower, and Lena, who worked in manufacturing jobs. He received an AB degree from Seton Hall University in 1964 and studied graduate sociology at Rutgers University from 1964-66.

Kohut was the founding director of the Pew Research Center and served as director of the Pew Research Center's Global Attitudes Project.

Kohut served as the center's president from 2004 to 2012 and directed the Pew Research Center for the People & the Press from 1993 to 2012. Kohut was a regular guest on National Public Radio, television news programs such as PBS NewsHour, and the editorial pages of major newspapers like The New York Times, where he presented Pew's poll results and analysis.

From 1979-1989, Kohut was president of the Gallup Organization, and in 1989 he founded Princeton Survey Research Associates, an attitude and opinion research firm specializing in media, politics and public policy. He is a past president of the American Association for Public Opinion Research and the National Council on Public Polls. His essays have appeared in the op-ed section of The New York Times and he has been a regular columnist for the Columbia Journalism Review and AOL News. Kohut was the co-author of four books, most recently America Against the World (Times Books). In 2000, he won the New York AAPOR Chapter Award for Outstanding Contribution to Opinion Research, and in 2005 he was awarded the American Association of Public Opinion Research’s Award for Exceptionally Distinguished Achievement, that organization’s highest honor. In 2014, Kohut received the Warren J. Mitofsky Award for Excellence in Public Opinion Research from the board of directors of the Roper Center for Public Opinion Research at Cornell University.

Kohut died of chronic lymphocytic leukemia on September 8, 2015, six days after his 73rd birthday.

References

External links
 About the Pew Research Center for the People and the Press
 About the Pew Global Attitudes Project
 Madeleine Albright, John Danforth, and Andrew Kohut, by David T. Cook, The Christian Science Monitor, June 23, 2006.  The former Secretary of State, former Senator, and Kohut discuss the divide between Islam and the West. 
 How Important Is the Iraq War for American Voters?, National Public Radio, Talk of the Nation, August 8, 2006

1942 births
2015 deaths
American political scientists
Seton Hall University alumni
Rutgers University alumni
People from Newark, New Jersey
People from Rochelle Park, New Jersey
Pollsters
Deaths from leukemia